Daoud Naji also spelled as Dawood Naji is an ethnic Hazara politician, political activist and journalist from Afghanistan. He was  senior political adviser to the Afghan National Security Council. Before he joined the government,  he was a senior leader of the Enlightenment Movement of Afghanistan and the Tabassum movement. Daoud Naji has previously been a BBC Radio journalist and worked for BBC world service for 14 years.

Early life and education
Daoud Naji was born on 17 June 1973 in Malistan, Ghazni province. He has a bachelor's degree in Persian language and literature from the Faculty of Language and Literature at Balkh University. When the Taliban came to power, he left Mazar-e-Sharif and went to Jaghori, Ghazni province, where he worked as a teacher.
In year 2000 he immigrated to Quetta, Pakistan and established the Albironi elementary School for refugees, which later became a high school. 
In 2002, he began working with BBC Persian as a local reporter in Helmand and Kandahar. In 2006, he moved to London to continue his job as a senior producer in BBC Persian. 
In 2009, he became the new Editor-in-Chief of BBC Persian online, the most visited website in Afghanistan, Tajikistan and Iran, for Persian speakers around the world. 
During 2011 and 2012, he began training online for Afghan journalists in a joint project with the support of the BBC and media action.
In 2014, he started writing for the daily Etilaat-e-Roz. Currently, he is a member of the editor's board of daily Etilaat-e-Roz. Daoud Naji has participated in several international conferences as a reporter.

References

1973 births
Living people
Afghan politicians
Hazara politicians